Robert Desbats (9 February 1922 – 16 April 2007) was a French racing cyclist. He rode in the 1948 and 1949 Tour de France.

References

External links
 

1922 births
2007 deaths
French male cyclists
Sportspeople from Dordogne
Cyclists from Nouvelle-Aquitaine